New York's 36th State Senate district is one of 63 districts in the New York State Senate. It has been represented by Democrat Jamaal Bailey since 2017; Bailey succeeded fellow Democrat Ruth Hassell-Thompson after she took a position in the administration of Governor Andrew Cuomo.

Geography
District 36 covers several neighborhoods in the north Bronx, including Norwood, Bedford Park, Williamsbridge, Co-op City, Wakefield, and Baychester, as well as the southern Westchester County city of Mount Vernon.

The district overlaps New York's 13th, 14th, and 16th congressional districts, and with the 78th, 80th, 81st, 82nd, 83rd, and 89th districts of the New York State Assembly.

Recent election results

2020

2018

2016

2014

2012

Federal results in District 36

References

36